In the pronunciation of the Russian language, several ways of vowel reduction (and its absence) are distinguished between the standard language and dialects. Russian orthography most often does not reflect vowel reduction, which can confuse foreign-language learners, but some spelling reforms have changed some words.

There are five vowel phonemes in Standard Russian. Vowels tend to merge when they are unstressed. The vowels  and  have the same unstressed allophones for a number of dialects and reduce to an unclear schwa . Under some circumstances,  and  may all merge. The fifth vowel, may also be centralized but does not typically merge with any of the other vowels.

Other types of reduction are phonetic, such as that of the high vowels ( and ), which become near-close.

General description 
The five Russian vowels  in unstressed position show two levels of reduction:
 The first-degree reduction in the first pretonic position (immediately before the stress).
 The second-degree reduction in positions other than the first pretonic position.

The allophonic result of the reduction is also heavily dependent on the quality or the nonexistence of the preceding consonant. Thus, the reduction is further grouped into three types according to the environment:
 After the hard (non-palatalized or velarized) consonants (including always hard ).
 After the soft (palatalized) consonants (including the soft  and ) and semi-vowel .

The unstressed vowels also may be grouped in series that reflect similar patterns of reduction:
 Back high  (never reduced).

High vowels
However, on the phonetic level, they show allophonic centralization, particularly under the influence of preceding or following consonants.

Nevertheless, in rapid colloquial speech they both may be reduced to schwa , for example,   ('kind', instrumental case, singular masculine neuter) versus   ('kind', prepositional case,  singular masculine neuter).

Back vowels

The phenomenon is called akanye, and some scholars postulate an early tendency towards it in the earliest known textual evidence of confusion between written "a" and "o" in a manuscript that was copied in Moscow in 1339.
Akanye contrasts with okanye pronunciations in Standard Russian as follows:
 After hard (non- palatalised) consonants, the standard phonological rules prescribe a two-level reduction. For example,   ('ferry'),   ('cloud'),   ('grass'). Shorter durations have the effect of gradually transforming  into schwa. Recently, it has been argued that the change of sound quality during the second-degree reduction is merely an artifact of duration-dependent "phonetic undershoot", when the speaker intends to pronounce , but the limited time reduces the likelihood of the tongue being able to arrive at the intended vowel target.
 In fast speech, reduction ultimately may result in the vowel being dropped altogether, with the preceding consonant slightly lengthened or turned into a syllabic consonant:  , vs.  ('boots'),   ('ceiling'),   ('ten').
That does not occur with other parts of speech.
This merger also occurs for  after retroflex consonants. Examples:   (phonetically ; 'wife'),   (phonetically ; 'tongue').

Across certain word-final suffixes, the reductions do not completely apply.

There are a number of exceptions to the above comments regarding the akanye:
  is not always reduced in borrowing from foreign languages:   ('radio'). The common pattern for that exception is the final unstressed  being preceded by another vowel.
  replaces  after  in the oblique cases of some numerals:   ('twenty').

Front vowels
Because  has several allophones (depending on both stress and proximity to palatalised consonants), unstressed  is pronounced as one of those allophones, rather than the close front unrounded vowel.

In registers without the merger (yekanye or ), unstressed  is more retracted. Even then, however, the distinction between unstressed  and unstressed  is most clearly heard in the syllable immediately before the stress. Both are pronounced  and  respectively.

Speakers may switch between both pronunciations because of various factors, the most important factor likely being the speed of pronunciation.

Yakanye

This pronunciation is observed in Belarusian  and in most Southern Russian dialects, as is expressed in a quip (with liberal yakanye):
{| class="wikitable"
|-
!Orthography
!Standard pronunciation
!Yakanye pronunciation
!Translation
|-
|
|
|
|And we have in Ryazan
|-
|
|
|
|Pies with eyes:
|-
|
|
|
|They are being eaten,
|-
|
|
|
|and they look.
|}

Spelling
Generally, vowel reduction is not reflected in the Russian spelling. However, in some words, the spelling has been changed based on vowel reduction and so some words are spelled despite their etymology:

Dictionaries often gave both spellings. That is, in cases of doubt, codifiers of 1956 based their choice not on etymological conformity but on the spread of usage.

See also 

 Russian phonology

Notes

References

Further reading

External links
 The Language of the Russian Village (A dialect atlas for use in Russian junior high school. Maps 12 and 13 shows the extent of vowel reduction in Russian dialects.) 

Russian language
Russian language varieties and styles
Vowels
Slavic phonologies